Itkuli (İtqol) is a rural locality (a selo) in Artakulsky Selsoviet, Karaidelsky District, Bashkortostan, Russia. The population was 101 as of 2010. There are 2 streets.

Geography 
Itkuli is located 45 km northwest of Karaidel (the district's administrative centre) by road. Starootkustino is the nearest rural locality.

References 

Rural localities in Karaidelsky District